Itxassou (Basque Itsasu) is a village and a commune in the Northern Basque Country, in the Pyrénées-Atlantiques department, in south-western France. It is part of the traditional Basque province of Labourd.

Population

See also
Communes of the Pyrénées-Atlantiques department

References

Communes of Pyrénées-Atlantiques
Pyrénées-Atlantiques communes articles needing translation from French Wikipedia